Baragi is a village in Mudhol, Bagalkot district, Karnataka, India. 10 KM away from taluka head quarter and 38 KM away from District Head Quarter Bagalkot.

References

Villages in Bagalkot district